Azerbaijan has participated at the Summer Youth Olympic Games in every edition since the inaugural 2010 Games and they participated the first time at the Winter Youth Olympic Games on 2020 Games.

Medal tables

Medals by Summer Games

Medals by Winter Games

Medals by Summer Sport

Medals by Winter Sport

List of medalists

Summer Games

Summer Games medalists as part of Mixed-NOCs Team

Flag bearers

See also
Azerbaijan at the Olympics
Azerbaijan at the Paralympics

External links
National Olympic Committee of the Azerbaijani Republic

 
Nations at the Youth Olympic Games
Youth sport in Azerbaijan